Family system may refer to:

Family,  a domestic group of people (or a number of domestic groups), typically affiliated by birth or marriage, or by comparable legal relationships 
"Family System", a song by Chevelle from their 2002 album Wonder What's Next
Internal Family Systems Model, a branch of psychotherapy focused on a metaphorical inner family that represents the different modes of human behavior
Family Therapy, a branch of therapy that works with families
Family Systems Theory, a branch of Systems psychology focused on the psychological relationship to ones family
Family System (martial arts)